Chen Man  (born 1980) is a Chinese visual artist. Her medium includes photography, graphic design, cinematography, and digital art. 

She also produces covers for fashion magazines and collaborates with major brands worldwide.

Biography
Born in Beijing in 1980, Chen Man grew up after the Cultural Revolution and was part of the generation of the Chinese one-child policy. Chen attended the Central Academy of Fine Arts and graduated in 2005, where she studied graphic design. 

At the age of 23, she published her self-styled photography as covers for Chinese art magazine VISION, bringing her immediate prominence for the first time as a student. Her early style includes extensive use of digital tools such as Photoshop and 3D Max to create an extravagant visual experience.

Man is also known for her hyper-realistic pop portraits like her 2012 "Whatever the Weather" covers. The series features an unsigned model and Tibetan teenagers from the Tibetan High School, an ethnic college. Man wanted to capture the "50 to 60 ethnic groups" that represent the beauty in China in her 12 photograph series for i-D. The issue was praised as both creative and forward thinking especially for her age. 

Not only has Man mastered cameras and computers, she has also mastered the seamless blend of her modern aesthetics with traditional Chinese culture into her work. This has led to people praising Man for assisting the evolution of China's aesthetics and redefining Chinese beauty.

To Man there are two ways of defining beauty and she finds "both sides of the coin beautiful. She believes in genuine beauty, "what feels real whether it's an emotion, an image, a person or an artwork" and technological beauty, like the beauty of phones and computers. With the tendency to look abroad for inspiration, Man is hoping that her work will encourage people to rethink beauty and start looking "to China for inspiration."

Career
In addition to producing covers for VISION magazine, Chen also does fashion photography for Vogue, Elle, Harper's Bazaar, Marie Claire, i-D, Cosmopolitan, and Esquire. 

She frequently works with makeup artist Toni Lee. 

Her own studio, Studio 6, based in Beijing, is producing advertising campaigns for brands such as L'Oréal, MAC, Dior, Canon, Guess, Hublot, Carl F. Bucherer, Sharp, Beats, Cadillac, Mercedes-Benz, Volkswagen, Motorola, Adidas, Puma, Converse, Uniqlo, Budweiser, Absolut Vodka, Shiseido, Maybelline etc.

Personal life 
Chen Man is married to American-born Raphael Ming Cooper, cofounder of Society Skateboards. She has two children.

Selected exhibitions
Chen's work has been widely exhibited:
2004: Out of the Window Space of Distraction, Tokyo
2005: Fashion and style in photography, Moscow 
2006: Wave Chinese media Art, 1997–2004, Walker Art Center, Minneapolis
2007: Galerie Loft, Paris
2008: Galerie Maeght, Paris
2008: China Design, Victoria and Albert Museum, London
2010: Red Beauty, Fabien Fryns Fine Art, Los Angeles
2010: Unbearable Beauty, Ooi Botos Gallery, Hong Kong 
2011: Today Art Museum, Beijing
2012: Chinese Art Centre, Manchester, UK
2012: Glamorous Futurist by Chen Man Exhibition, Diesel Art Gallery, Tokyo
2013: Artist Special Project, Como Hotel, Bangkok
2013: Proud of Dignity 2012, Lady Dior Exhibition, Paris
2013: Galerie Steph+Four Season Hotel Exhibition, Four Season Hotel, Singapore
2014: A New Attitude: Chen Man's Provocative Interpretations of Contemporary Chinese Women Exhibition, RedLine Art Center, Denver

References

External links
 Chen Man's website
 Chen Man on Weibo
 Chen Man on Facebook
 Chen Man on Twitter
 Chen Man's Artwork on Fabien Fryns Fine Art
 Chen Man's interview with New York Times 
 Chen Man's interview with Luxury Insider 

Chinese photographers
1980 births
Chinese women photographers
Artists from Beijing
Fashion photographers
Central Academy of Fine Arts alumni
Living people
Chinese women artists